2-Diphenylphosphinobenzaldehyde is a phosphine ligand with the formula (C6H5)2PC6H4CHO.  It is a yellow solid that dissolves in common organic solvents.

Synthesis and reactions
2-Diphenylphosphinobenzaldehyde was first prepared by the reaction of chlorodiphenylphosphine with the Grignard reagent derived from the protected 2-bromobenzaldehyde, followed by deprotection. It can also be derived from (2-lithiophenyl)diphenylphosphine.

The compound condenses with a variety of amines to give phosphine-imine and phosphine-amine ligands.

References

Tertiary phosphines
Benzaldehydes
Phenyl compounds